Jackline Maranga (born December 16, 1977, in Nyanturago, Kisii) is a retired Kenyan middle-distance runner. She won a silver medal at the World Junior Championships at the age of 15, and also won silver medals in the two following Championships, being the only athlete to do so.

She is perhaps best known for winning the 1500 metres gold at the 1998 Commonwealth Games. Together with 10000 metres winner Esther Wanjiru, she became the first Kenyan woman to win Commonwealth Games gold medal.

She is also a world champion in cross-country running as she won the women's short course at the 1999 IAAF World Cross Country Championships.

Maranga is married to Tom Nyariki.

Achievements

External links

Pace Sports Management (Internet Archive)

1977 births
Living people
Kenyan female long-distance runners
Kenyan female middle-distance runners
Athletes (track and field) at the 1994 Commonwealth Games
Athletes (track and field) at the 1998 Commonwealth Games
Athletes (track and field) at the 2002 Commonwealth Games
World Athletics Cross Country Championships winners
Commonwealth Games medallists in athletics
Commonwealth Games gold medallists for Kenya
World Athletics Championships athletes for Kenya
African Games silver medalists for Kenya
African Games medalists in athletics (track and field)
Kenyan female cross country runners
African Games bronze medalists for Kenya
Athletes (track and field) at the 1999 All-Africa Games
Athletes (track and field) at the 2003 All-Africa Games
Medallists at the 1998 Commonwealth Games